Revolutionary Vanguard (Politico-Military) (in Spanish: Vanguardia Revolucionaria (Político-Militar)) was a militant Peruvian left group, and a splinter group of Revolutionary Vanguard (VR).

Communist parties in Peru
Defunct communist militant groups
Defunct political parties in Peru
Political schisms